The 2014–15 Florida Gulf Coast Eagles men's basketball team represented Florida Gulf Coast University (FGCU) in the 2014–15 NCAA Division I men's basketball season. FGCU was a member of the Atlantic Sun Conference. They played their home games at Alico Arena and were led by second year head coach Joe Dooley. They finished the season 22–11, 12–3 in A-Sun play to finish in second place. They advanced to the semifinals of the A-Sun tournament where they lost to USC Upstate. They received an invitation to the CollegeInsider.com Tournament where they lost in the first round to Texas A&M–Corpus Christi.

Pre-season
Departures

Class of 2014 Signees

Roster

Schedule 

|-
!colspan=9 style=| Non-conference regular season

|-
!colspan=9 style=| Atlantic Sun regular season

|-
!colspan=12 style=| Atlantic Sun tournament

|-
!colspan=12 style=| CIT

References

Florida Gulf Coast Eagles men's basketball seasons
Florida Gulf Coast
Florida Gulf Coast